Zbyněk Mařák (born August 12, 1971) is a Czech former professional ice hockey right winger.

Mařák played in the Czech Extraliga for HC Vsetín, HC Slezan Opava, HC Zlín and HC Znojenmští Orli. He also played in the Slovak Extraliga for HK 36 Skalica and the Belarusian Extraleague for HC Dinamo Minsk.

Mařák is presently working as head coach of PSG Berani Zlín's U20 academy,

References

External links

1971 births
Living people
Czech ice hockey right wingers
HC Dinamo Minsk players
GIJS Groningen players
SHK Hodonín players
Orli Znojmo players
HK 36 Skalica players
HC Slezan Opava players
Sportspeople from Zlín
VHK Vsetín players
Grizzlys Wolfsburg players
PSG Berani Zlín players
Czechoslovak ice hockey right wingers
Czech ice hockey coaches
Czechoslovak expatriate sportspeople in the Netherlands
Czechoslovak expatriate ice hockey people
Expatriate ice hockey players in the Netherlands
Czech expatriate sportspeople in Belarus
Expatriate ice hockey players in Belarus
Czech expatriate ice hockey players in Slovakia
Czech expatriate ice hockey players in Germany